Seysmopartiya is a rural locality (a settlement) in Krasnovishersky District, Perm Krai, Russia. The population was 81 as of 2010. There is 1 street.

References 

Rural localities in Krasnovishersky District